Asterion can refer to:

 Asterion, name of multiple figures in Greek mythology
 Asterion, a star, also known as Chara or as Beta Canum Venaticorum in the constellation of Canes Venatici
 The House of Asterion, a short tale by Jorge Luis Borges
 Asterion (anatomy), a point on the human skull
 Asterion, a Thessalian Argonaut in Argonautica
 Lamborghini Asterion, a sports car
 Asterion (city), an ancient city of Thessaly, Greece

Asterios can refer to:

 Asterios Polyp, a graphic novel by David Mazzucchelli
 Asterios Karagiannis, a Greek footballer
 Asterios, an Achaean Argonaut in Argonautica